Muhaqqaq is one of the main six types of calligraphic script in Arabic. The Arabic word muḥaqqaq means "consummate" or "clear", and originally was used to denote any accomplished piece of calligraphy.

Often used to copy maṣāḥif (singular muṣḥaf, i.e. loose sheets of Quran texts), this intricate type of script was considered one of the most beautiful, as well as one of the most difficult to execute well. The script saw its greatest use in the Mameluk era (1250–1516/1517). In the Ottoman Empire, it was gradually displaced by Thuluth and Naskh; from the 18th century onward, its use was largely restricted to the Basmala in Hilyas.

History 
The earliest reference to muḥaqqaq writing is found in the Kitab al-Fihrist by Ibn al-Nadim, and the term was probably in use since the beginning of the Abbasid era to denote a specific writing style. Master calligraphers like Ibn Muqla and Ibn al-Bawwab contributed to the development of this and other scripts, and defined its rules and standards within Islamic calligraphy.

Gallery

See also 

 Arabic calligraphy
 Islamic calligraphy

Notes

References 
 Nassar Mansour (author), Mark Allen (ed.): Sacred Script: Muhaqqaq in Islamic Calligraphy, I.B.Tauris & Co Ltd, New York 2011, 

Arabic calligraphy